Proxenus is a genus of moths of the family Noctuidae erected by Gottlieb August Wilhelm Herrich-Schäffer in 1850. The genus was included within Athetis by Robert W. Poole in 1989, but re-instated in 2010.

Species
 Proxenus mendosa (McDunnough, 1927)
 Proxenus mindara (Barnes & McDunnough, 1913)
 Proxenus miranda (Grote, 1873)

References

Caradrinini